Vo is a prefecture located in the Maritime Region of Togo. The prefecture seat is located in Vogan. Amegnran is a village in the prefecture.

Cantons of Vo include Vogan, Togoville, Anyronkopé, Akoumapé, Vo-Koutimé, Dzrékpo, Dagbati, Sévagan, Momé-Hounkpati, and Hahotoé.

Kusegbe Legbanou is a village in Vogan, preferably called Vo-Legbanou, Vogan, Togo. There are several villages that are under Vo prefecture.

References 

Prefectures of Togo
Maritime Region